Ramigani Madan Mohan Reddy (died 19 November 2022), better known as R. R. Madan or simply Madan, was an Indian Telugu film director, writer and producer. He was born and brought up in Madanapalle, Chittoor district of Andhra Pradesh. He has done his graduation from Sri Venkateswara University, Tirupathi at Annie Besant Theosophical College, Madanapalli. He used to write short stories and direct play-lets during his college days. Later he moved to Hyderabad where the regional Film Industry in Telugu language is located. He worked for 2 years as an assistant cameraman under Mr. S. Gopal Reddy, a popular film cameraman. Later he has worked as a co-writer for few films. He is currently regarded as one of the promising Script writers and Directors in the Telugu Film Industry for his creative thinking, innovative subjects and intellectual content.

In 2004, he became popular by the film Aa Naluguru one of the classic Telugu films, as a script writer. He penned story, screen play and dialogues for Aa Naluguru.- starring Rajendra Prasad. The movie has thought provoking message and received three Andhra Pradesh State Nandi Awards i.e. Best film, Best actor and Best character. In 2006, under his own banner "Aa Naluguru films," he had written, produced and directed Pellaina Kothalo  starring Jagapathi Babu and Priyamani. The film was well received by the audience particularly by the youth and went on to become a super hit movie.

Madan died from a stroke on 19 November 2022.

Filmography

Writer, director and producer

References

External links 
 Indiaglitz article
 Cinegoer interview
 Deccan chronicle interview
 Idlebrain interview
 News article

Year of birth missing
20th-century births
2022 deaths
Telugu film directors
Sri Venkateswara University alumni
Film directors from Andhra Pradesh
People from Chittoor district
Telugu screenwriters
Telugu film producers
Film producers from Andhra Pradesh
21st-century Indian film directors
Screenwriters from Andhra Pradesh